Akaki Khorava (29 April 1895 - 23 June 1972) was a Georgian and Soviet actor, theater director and pedagogue. He appeared in more than fifteen films from 1924 to 1965.

He is best known for his performances in The Great Warrior Skanderbeg and Giorgi Saakadze.

References

External links 

1895 births
1972 deaths
20th-century male actors from Georgia (country)
People from Kutais Governorate
Communist Party of the Soviet Union members
First convocation members of the Supreme Soviet of the Soviet Union
Second convocation members of the Supreme Soviet of the Soviet Union
Third convocation members of the Supreme Soviet of the Soviet Union
Fourth convocation members of the Supreme Soviet of the Soviet Union
People's Artists of Georgia
People's Artists of the USSR
Stalin Prize winners
Recipients of the Order of Lenin
Recipients of the Order of the Red Banner of Labour
Recipients of the Order of the Red Star
Male film actors from Georgia (country)
Male stage actors from Georgia (country)
Theatre directors from Georgia (country)
Soviet drama teachers
Soviet male film actors

Soviet male stage actors
Soviet theatre directors
Burials at Mtatsminda Pantheon